The 1997 All-Ireland Senior Club Camogie Championship for the leading clubs in the women's team field sport of camogie was won for the second time in succession by Pádraig Pearse's GAA, (Galway), who defeated Lisdowney (Kilkenny) in the final, played at Ballymacward.

Arrangements
The championship was organised on the traditional provincial system used in Gaelic Games since the 1880s, with Loughgiel Shamrocks and Granagh-Ballingarry winning the championships of the other two provinces.

The Final
Martina Haverty's goal for Pearses proved decisive in the final, as the Galway team led 3–3 to 1–0 at half time but had to contend with a Lisdoweny comeback which began when Ann Downey scored a goal from a free and Marina Downey added three points.

Final stages

References

External links
 Camogie Association

1997 in camogie
1997